How to Save a Marriage and Ruin Your Life is a 1968 American comedy romance film directed by Fielder Cook. It stars Dean Martin, Stella Stevens and husband and wife Eli Wallach and Anne Jackson.

Plot
David Sloane is a confirmed bachelor whose married pal Harry Hunter is having an affair. David decides to do something about it so Harry doesn't mess up his home life.

The scheme is to make a play for Harry's mistress himself. David meets and courts Harry's attractive employee, Carol Corman, determined to break up her fling with Harry once and for all. David's plan goes wrong because he has the wrong woman. Harry's actual mistress is Carol's next-door neighbor, Muriel Laszlo. As soon as he learns (mistakenly) that she is seeing another man, Harry decides to give his marriage to Mary one more try.

Carol and Muriel come to realize what happened. They decide to team up, giving David and Harry a taste of their own medicine.

Cast
 Dean Martin as David Sloane
 Stella Stevens as Carol Corman
 Eli Wallach as Harry Hunter
 Anne Jackson as Muriel Laszlo
 Betty Field as Thelma
 Jack Albertson as Mr. Slotkin 
 Katharine Bard as Mary Hunter
 Woodrow Parfrey as Eddie Rankin
 Alan Oppenheimer as Everett Bauer 
 Shelley Morrison as Marcia Borie
 George Furth as Roger

Reception
Roger Ebert said that it was made with "great goodwill", but also deemed it old-fashioned compared to then-recent films like The Graduate.

See also
 List of American films of 1968

References

External links
 
 
 
 
 

1968 films
1960s sex comedy films
American sex comedy films
1960s English-language films
Films scored by Michel Legrand
Films directed by Fielder Cook
1968 comedy films
1960s American films